Bauerbach is a borough (Ortsbezirk) of Marburg in Hesse.

References

External links 
 Official website of Bauerbach 
 Information about Bauerbach at www.marburg.de 
 

Districts of Marburg
Marburg-Biedenkopf